Dark Slayer is the twentieth title in Christine Feehan’s Dark Series, a series of paranormal/romances featuring the Carpathians (race).

Awards and nominations
Made the Following Bestseller Lists:
New York Times #1
USA Today 
Publishers Weekly 
Barnes & Noble Mass Market 
Bookscan   
Borders  
Amazon 
Walmart

External links
Read Chapter 1

2009 American novels
Novels by Christine Feehan

American vampire novels
American romance novels